Andrianov (masculine) or Andrianova (feminine) is a Russian last name, a variant of Adrianov.

People with the last name
Alexey Andrianov, director of the 2012 Russian movie Spy
Anatoli N. Andrianov (b. 1936), Russian mathematician
Nadija Hordijenko Andrianova (1921–1998), Ukrainian writer
Nikolai Andrianov (Nikolay Andrianov) (1952–2011), Soviet/Russian Olympic gymnast
Olga Andrianova (born 1949), Soviet Olympic athlete, discus throw at the 1976 Summer Olympics
Olga Andrianova (curler) (born 1952), Russian curler and coach
Tatyana Andrianova (b. 1979), Russian middle-distance runner
Vasily Andrianov (politician) (1902–1978), Soviet politician
Vasily Ivanovich Andrianov (1920–1999), Soviet aviation commander

Toponyms
Andrianov (rural locality), a rural locality (a khutor) in Ostrovyanskoye Rural Settlement of Orlovsky District in Rostov Oblast

See also
Andrianovo, several rural localities in Russia

References

Notes

Sources
И. М. Ганжина (I. M. Ganzhina). "Словарь современных русских фамилий" (Dictionary of Modern Russian Last Names). Москва, 2001. 

Russian-language surnames